David Rumsey is an American map collector.

David Rumsey may also refer to:

 David Rumsey (politician) (1810-1883), United States Representative from New York
 David Rumsey (organist) (1939–2017), Australian organist and composer
 Dave Rumsey,  musician in the group Earthsuit

See also
 David Ramsey (disambiguation)
 David Ramsay (disambiguation)